The 2007–08 LNB Pro A season was the 86th season of the French Basketball Championship and the 21st season since inception of the Ligue Nationale de Basketball (LNB). The regular season started on September 29, 2007 and ended on May 14, 2008. The play-offs were held from May 20, 2008 till June 15, 2008.

Nancy, after finishing at the second top seed of the regular season, won the French Pro A League by defeating Roanne in playoffs final (84-53).

Promotion and relegation 
Due to the change of the Pro A league format from 18 clubs to 16 between the 2006–07 and 2007–08 seasons, only 1 club is promoted from 2006 to 2007 Pro B league (French 2nd division) and 3 clubs are sent to 2007-08 Pro B league.

 At the beginning of the 2007–08 season
Teams promoted from 2006 to 2007 Pro B
 Vichy

Teams relegated to 2007–08 Pro B
 Besançon
 Bourg-en-Bresse
 Reims

 At the end of the 2007–08 season
 2007-08 Pro A Champion: Nancy

Teams promoted from 2007 to 2008 Pro B
 Rouen
 Besançon

Teams relegated to 2008–09 Pro B
 Paris-Levallois
 Clermont-Ferrand

Team arenas

Team standings

Playoffs

Awards

Regular Season MVPs 
 "Foreign" MVP:  Marc Salyers (Roanne)
 "French" MVP:  Nando de Colo (Cholet)

Best Coach 
  Christian Monschau (Le Havre)

Most Improved Player 
  Nando de Colo (Cholet)

Best Defensive Player 
  Dounia Issa (Vichy)

Rising Star Award 
  Nicolas Batum (Le Mans)

Player of the month

References

External links
  LNB website

LNB Pro A seasons
French
basketball
basketball